Bence Bátor (born 23 July 1977) is a Hungarian musician, best known as session drummer and the drummer of the Hungarian indie band Amber Smith and "Frenk" and "ABBA Tribute Show" and also of "Bowies Keep Swinging", a David Bowie tribute band and in other projects. Bátor has been pursuing a modeling and commercial acting career in Hungary and worldwide.

Early life and personal life
Bátor was born in Tatabánya, Hungary. He attended the Kodolányi János University of Applied Sciences. He moved to the capital of Hungary, Budapest in 1997, where he still resides.

Amber Smith

Bátor joined Amber Smith in 2000. Bátor has played the drums on four Amber Smith albums, RePRINT, Introspective, Amber Smith, Modern and NEW.

Discography
With Amber Smith:
Albums

 rePRINT (2006)
 Introspective (2008)
 Amber Smith (2012)
 Modern (2015)
 NEW (2017)

Instruments

Drums
Bátor uses TAMA drums: TAMA Silverstar Birch Limited Edition kit in "Snow White Pearl" finish.
Bátor uses full TAMA hardwares and MEINL Byzance Vintage Sand cymbals.

Modelling career
Bátor appeared in commercials for several companies, including T-Mobile, Grando.hu, Füstli, Minor Falling In Love, Heizen Mit Öl, Flavon, CIB Bank, Honda, Grundfos, and Telenor.

See also
Budapest indie music scene
Amber Smith
Imre Poniklo

References

External links
 Bátor on Discogs

1977 births
Living people
Hungarian indie rock musicians
Musicians from Budapest
Kodolányi János University of Applied Sciences alumni